Bass Ackwards is a film written, starring and directed by Linas Phillips and also starring Davie-Blue, Jim Fletcher and Paul Lazar.

The film stars Phillips as a man who embarks on cross-country journey in a modified VW bus after ending a disastrous affair with a married woman.

Bass Ackwards was named an official selection in the 2010 Sundance Film Festival for inclusion in NEXT, a new category that recognized films for their innovative and original work in low-and-no-budget filmmaking, and is part of a wave of films that showcases the diversity of independent cinema. The film was released to video on demand platforms on February 1, 2010.

Plot

Linas finds a forgotten van on a llama farm outside Seattle, and embarks on a road trip east with nothing to lose.

Cast and crew
 Linas Phillips (director, writer, "Linas")
 Mark Duplass (executive producer)
 Thomas Woodrow (producer)
 Sean Porter (cinematographer, co-writer)
 Paul Lazar ("Paul", co-writer)
 Jim Fletcher ("Jim", co-writer)
 Davie-Blue  ("Georgia", co-writer)

Production

The film was made on a micro-budget of $35,000. Director Linas Phillips had previously made some documentary films but Bass Ackwards was his first narrative feature. The film was produced by and executive produced by Mark Duplass.

Reception

The film received generally positive reviews.

References

External links
 Official website 
 
 
 

2010 films
2010s English-language films
2010 comedy films
American comedy films
2010s American films